Enamel-renal syndrome is a rare autosomal recessive condition. This condition is also known as idiopathic multicentric osteolysis with nephropathy. It is characterised by dental abnormalities and nephrocalcinosis.

Presentation
The dental abnormalities include
 hypoplastic amelogenesis imperfecta
 microdontia
 intra-pulpal calcification
 impacted posterior teeth with hyperplastic pericoronal follicles
 gingival fibromatosis
 ectopic calcifications on gingival and pericoronal tissues

Genetics

This condition is caused by mutations in the FAM20A gene. This gene encodes a protein – the Golgi apparatus associated secretory pathway pseudokinase. The gene is located on the long arm of chromosome 17 (17q24.2).

Pathogensis

The protein is an allosteric activator of the Golgi serine/threonine protein kinase and is involved in biomineralization of teeth.

Diagnosis

The diagnosis may be suspected on the basis of the constellation of clinical features. It is made by sequencing the FAM20A gene.

This condition is usually diagnosed in childhood but may not be recognised until early adulthood. The diagnosis is suspected on the combination of nephrocalcinosis and dental abnormalities.

Differential diagnosis
 Epidermolysis bullosa
 Jalili syndrome
 Raine syndrome
 Tricho-dento-osseous syndrome

Treatment

There is no specific treatment for this condition currently known and management of its various features is the norm.

History

This condition was first described in 1972.

References 

Genetic diseases and disorders
Rare diseases
Autosomal recessive disorders